The Chief of the Joint Chiefs of Staff of the Armed Forces is the professional head of the Argentine Armed Forces. He is  responsible for the administration and the operational control of the Argentine military. It is the highest rank military position in the country. 

The current JEMCFFAA is General Juan Martín Paleo. He was appointed by President Alberto Fernández on 27 February 2020, by Decree 178/2020.

List
There have been a number of officers serving as the JEMCFFAA:

See also

Argentine Armed Forces
Chief of the General Staff of the Argentine Army
Chief of the General Staff of the Argentine Navy
Chief of the General Staff of the Argentine Air Force

References

Military of Argentina
Argentina